Denis Leslie Watson (born 18 October 1955) is a professional golfer from Zimbabwe.

Early life and amateur career 
Born in Salisbury, Rhodesia (now Harare, Zimbabwe) Watson was educated at Oriel Boys High School, Chisipite. He represented Rhodesia at the 1974 Eisenhower Trophy in the Dominican Republic, in the same team as Mark McNulty, George Harvey and Teddy Webber. The team finished 14th and Watson best Rhodesian player.

In August 1975, Watson, together with George Harvey, represented Rhodesia at El Rincon Golf Club in Bogotá, Colombia, among 18 two-man nation teams, competing for the Coupa El Rincon over 72 holes stroke-play. The Rhodesian team won, ten strokes ahead of Sweden, and Watson won individually on a score of 7-under par 281, five strokes ahead of Jan Rube, Sweden.

Watson was awarded Rhodesian Sportsman of the Year in 1975 but would represent South Africa as a professional in the World Series of Golf in 1980 and 1982. Watson had served in the Rhodesian military during what he described as a "terrorist war" in the early 1970s and would then immigrate to neighboring South Africa to pursue his golf career.

Professional career 
Watson turned professional in 1976 and played on the European Tour from 1978 to 1980.  Relocating to the United States, where he joined the PGA Tour, he had his career year in 1984 when he won the Buick Open, NEC World Series of Golf, and Panasonic Las Vegas Invitational to tie for the most wins on the PGA Tour that season.

Watson finished tied for second in the 1985 U.S. Open, missing out on forcing a playoff by one shot, having incurred a two-stroke penalty earlier in the tournament. The penalty was assessed on the eighth hole in the first round, after he had waited longer than the allowed ten seconds for a putt that had hung on the lip of the hole to drop in. The ball did fall into the hole, but the birdie was disallowed and the penalty strokes added. The USGA and The R&A, the sports governing bodies, have since amended the penalty for this rules infraction to just a single stroke. Andy North eventually beat him by one shot.

Watson's career came to a sudden halt when he was injured while playing in the 1985 Goodyear Classic in South Africa. While hitting his ball out of the rough with a 9-iron, he struck a tree stump that had been hidden from view causing damage to his wrist, elbow and neck. He went on to win the tournament, but his problems had just begun. He required surgery on his wrist and neck, and was initially told that he would never play again. He did, but was unable to consistently reach the high standard that he had previously attained and after several more operations he retired towards the end of the 1990s.

After turning fifty, Watson joined the Champions Tour, and began to rediscover competitive form. He won the 2007 Senior PGA Championship at Kiawah Island, a senior major, by two strokes over Argentina's Eduardo Romero, his first win in 21 years. He was voted the 2007 Champions Tour Rookie of the Year.

Amateur wins
1975 Coupa El Rincon, Colombia (team with George Harvey and individual)

Professional wins (9)

PGA Tour wins (3)

PGA Tour playoff record (0–1)

Sunshine Tour wins (2)

Champions Tour wins (4)

Champions Tour playoff record (2–0)

Playoff record
Other playoff record (0–1)

Results in major championships

CUT = missed the half-way cut (3rd round cut in 1980 Open Championship)
WD = withdrew
"T" = tied

Summary

Most consecutive cuts made – 5 (twice)
Longest streak of top-10s – 1

Senior major championships

Wins (1)

Results timeline
Results not in chronological order before 2012.

CUT = missed the halfway cut
DQ = Disqualified
"T" indicates a tie for a place

Team appearances
Amateur
Eisenhower Trophy (representing Rhodesia): 1974
Coupa El Rincon, Colombia (representing Rhodesia): 1975 (winners and individual winner)

See also 

 Spring 1981 PGA Tour Qualifying School graduates

References

External links

Zimbabwean male golfers
European Tour golfers
PGA Tour golfers
Sunshine Tour golfers
PGA Tour Champions golfers
European Senior Tour golfers
Winners of senior major golf championships
1955 births
Living people